Everywhere at the End of Time is the eleventh and final recording by the Caretaker, an alias of English electronic musician Leyland Kirby. Released between 2016 and 2019, its six studio albums use degrading loops of sampled ballroom music to portray the progression of Alzheimer's disease. Inspired by the success of An Empty Bliss Beyond This World (2011), Kirby produced Everywhere as his final major work under the alias. The albums were produced in Kraków and released over six-month periods to "give a sense of time passing", with abstract album covers by his friend Ivan Seal. The series drew comparisons to the works of composer William Basinski and electronic musician Burial, while the later stages were influenced by avant-gardist composer John Cage.

The series comprises six hours of music, portraying a range of emotions and characterised by noise throughout. Although the first three stages are similar to An Empty Bliss, the last three depart from Kirby's earlier ambient works. The albums reflect the patient's disorder and death, their feelings, and the phenomenon of terminal lucidity. To promote the series, anonymous visual artist Weirdcore created music videos for the first two stages. At first, concerned about whether the series would seem pretentious, Kirby thought of not creating Everywhere at all; he spent more time producing it than any of his other releases. The album covers received attention from a French art exhibition named after the Caretaker's Everywhere, an Empty Bliss (2019), a compilation of archived songs.

As each stage was released, the series received increasingly positive reviews from critics; its length and dementia-driven concept led many reviewers to feel emotional about the complete edition. Considered to be Kirby's magnum opus, Everywhere was one of the most praised music releases of the 2010s. Caregivers of people with dementia also praised the albums for increasing empathy for patients among younger listeners, although some medics felt the series was too linear. It became an Internet phenomenon in the early 2020s, emerging in TikTok videos as a listening challenge, being transformed into a mod for the video game Friday Night Funkin' (2020), and appearing in internet memes.

Background

In 1999, English electronic musician Leyland Kirby adopted the pseudonym the Caretaker, whose work sampled big band records. Kirby drew influence from the haunted-ballroom scene of filmmaker Stanley Kubrick's work The Shining (1980), as heard on the debut release of the alias, Selected Memories from the Haunted Ballroom (1999). His first records featured the ambient style that would be prominent in his last releases. The project first explored memory loss in Theoretically Pure Anterograde Amnesia (2005), a three-hour-long album portraying the disease of the same name. By 2008, Persistent Repetition of Phrases saw the Caretaker alias gaining critical attention and a larger fanbase.

In 2011, Kirby released An Empty Bliss Beyond This World, attaining acclaim for its exploration of Alzheimer's disease. Although Kirby initially did not want to produce more music as the Caretaker, he said, "so many people liked An Empty Bliss. So I thought to myself, 'What can I do that's not just An Empty Bliss again? Kirby felt the only concept left to explore was the "stages of dementia". It would be his final release as the Caretaker; Kirby said, "I just can't see where I can take it after this." Everywhere at the End of Time represents the symbolical "death" of the Caretaker alias itself, with many samples from the pseudonym's earlier albums being used in it.

Music and stages

The albums, which Kirby describes as exploring dementia's "advancement and totality", present poetic track titles and descriptions for each stage, which represent a person with dementia and their feelings. Ideas of deterioration, melancholy, confusion, and abstractness are present throughout; according to writer Alexandra Weiss, Kirby's work "raises significant questions about Western attitudes toward death." Tiny Mix Tapes suggested that, as the swan song of the Caretaker alias, Everywhere "threatens at every moment to give way to nothing." The albums feature an avant-gardist, experimental concept, with music magazine Fact noting a "hauntological link" between Everywheres style and vaporwave's themes. Author Sarah Nove praised Everywheres lack of a physical form of aura, while Bandcamp Dailys Matt Mitchell wrote that the series ends in "ethereal catharsis".

The series' exploration of decay drew comparisons to The Disintegration Loops (2002–2003) by musician William Basinski, which, unlike Kirby's work, focuses on physical tape decay in coincidence with the September 11 attacks–not software-induced decay representative of a neurological disease. Although positive of Basinski's works, Kirby said his own "aren't just loops breaking down. They're about why they're breaking down, and how." The sound of Everywhere has also been compared to the style of electronic musician Burial; author Matt Colquhoun wrote for The Quietus that both artists "highlight the 'broken time of the twenty-first century. While reviewing the first stage, writers Adrian Mark Lore and Andrea Savage commended the record for enjoyers of Basinski, Stars of the Lid, and Brian Eno. Certain samples return constantly throughout—in particular, the 1931 song "Heartaches" as covered by Al Bowlly—and become more degraded with each album. In the last six minutes, a song from Selected Memories can be heard.

The songs get more distorted with each stage, reflecting the patient's memory and its deterioration. The jazz style of the first three stages is reminiscent of An Empty Bliss, using loops from vinyl records and wax cylinders. On Stage 3, the songs are shorter—some lasting for only one minute—and typically avoid fade-outs. The Post-Awareness stages reflect Kirby's desire to "explore complete confusion, where everything starts breaking down." The two penultimate stages present chaos in their music, representing the patient's altered perception of reality. The final stage consists of drones, portraying the emptiness of the afflicted person's mind. In its last 15 minutes, it features an organ, choral, and a minute of silence, portraying death. Stages 4–6 are often highlighted as the focus of Everywheres concept and composition: Miles Bowe of Pitchfork wrote about the contrast of the later stages to Kirby's other ambient works as "evolving its sound in new and often frightening ways", while Kirby described the series to be "more about the last three [stages] than the first three." In their Handbook of the Anthropology of Sound, Bloomsbury Academic describes the later stages as "a disorienting cut-up of slurred reminiscences bathing in a reverberant fog", relating them to amusia and its effects on musical memory.

Stages 1–3

Stage 1 is described as the initial signs of memory deterioration, being the closest album in the series to "a beautiful daydream". On its vinyl release, it features inscripted text reading "Memories That Last a Lifetime". Like An Empty Bliss, Stage 1 features the opening seconds of records from the 1920s and 1930s, looped for long lengths. Its samples are altered with pitch changes, reverberation, overtones, and vinyl crackle. The album features a range of emotions, mostly by the notions its song titles invoke; names such as "Into each other's eyes" are sometimes interpreted as a romantic memory of the patient, while more ominous titles, such as "We Don't Have Many Days", point to the patient recognising their own mortality. Despite being an upbeat release by the Caretaker, some of its joyful big band compositions are more distorted than others, with one author finding it mildly melancholic. One reviewer likened it to Stanley Kubrick's Eyes Wide Shut (1999) and the works of filmmaker Woody Allen, specifying the "elegance" of Kubrick's film and the dramatic avidity of Allen's work.

Stage 2 is described as the "self-realisation that something is wrong and a refusal to accept that." In contrast with the first stage's joyful sound, Kirby described the second stage as having "a massive difference between the moods"; "A Losing Battle Is Raging" represents a transition between the first and second stages. The album features a more emotional tone than Stage 1, with more melancholic, degraded and droning samples. Its source material features more abrupt endings, exploring a hauntological ambience. Track titles, such as "Surrendering to Despair" and "Last Moments of Pure Recall", represent the patient's awareness of their disorder and the accompanying sorrow, with the name "The Way Ahead Feels Lonely" being directly lifted from a book on dementia by Sally Magnusson. The songs play for longer times and feature fewer loops, but are more deteriorated in quality, symbolising the patient's realisation of their faulty memory and the resulting feelings of denial. Kirby described the second stage as one in which a person "probably tries and remember more than [they] usually would".

Stage 3 is described as the patient experiencing "some of the last coherent memories before confusion fully rolls in and the grey mists form and fade away." Samples from other works, such as those of An Empty Bliss, return with an underwater-like sound, portraying the patient's growing despair and struggle to keep their memories. While other stages presented common fade-outs on tracks, songs of Stage 3 end abruptly. Track titles become more abstract, combining names of songs from the previous stages and An Empty Bliss to create phrases such as "Sublime Beyond Loss" and "Internal Bewildered World". The record focuses on the patient's awareness, being the most similar record to An Empty Bliss of the series. Kirby explained that Stage 3 is "the most like An Empty Bliss because it's the blissful stage where you're unaware you've actually got dementia." The final tracks of the album are the last recognisable melodies, although some nearly lose their melodic qualities; in Kirby's description, Stage 3 represents "the last embers of awareness before we enter the post awareness stages."

The opening track of Stage 1, "It's Just a Burning Memory", introduces the sample of Al Bowlly's "Heartaches" that gets degraded throughout the series; according to Kirby, Bowlly is "one of the main guys" sampled in the Caretaker alias. In the third track of Stage 2, "What Does It Matter How My Heart Breaks", "Heartaches" returns in a lethargic style, using a different cover of the same song. This specific version, in contrast to its Stage 1 counterpart, sounded downbeat to Kirby. The second track of Stage 3, "And Heart Breaks", contains the last coherent version of "Heartaches", where its horn aspects become more similar to white noise. The songs sampling "Heartaches" take their title from the sample's lyrics, which surround themes of memory; Bowlly sings, "I can't believe it's just a burning memory / Heartaches, heartaches / What does it matter how my heart breaks?"

Stages 4–6

Stage 4 is described as the point at which "the ability to recall singular memories gives way to confusions and horror." It presents a style more akin to noise, in contrast to the first three stages, which featured the same style as An Empty Bliss. Marking the start of the "Post-Awareness" stages, its four compositions occupy whole vinyl sides. Tracks G1, H1, and J1 are titled "Post Awareness Confusions", which Bowe felt were clinical names, while I1 is titled "Temporary Bliss State". The incoherent melodies introduce a surreal aspect, which some writers opine prepares the listener for the last two stages. Most of the compositions ignore the alias' previous style and use far more distortion than do previous stages. One specific segment of H1, known as the "Hell Sirens", presents a horn sample that Hazelwood called "one of the most horrifying moments of the series." However, "Temporary Bliss State" is a track calmer than the "Post Awareness Confusions", featuring a more ethereal sound. The album's ambience has been likened to experimental musician Oval's album 94 Diskont (1995), with Hazelwood claiming Stage 4s "aural horror" serves as the representation of "echoes of melody and memory".

Stage 5 is described as having "more extreme entanglements, repetition and rupture [that] can give way to calmer moments." The album expands its noise influence and has similarities with the works of Merzbow and John Wiese; in its ear-piercing, more violent tone, coherent melodies lose significance, replaced by overlapped samples. Hazelwood interpreted it as "a traffic jam in audio form", likening it to neurons that become filled with beta amyloids. The record significantly differs from previous albums, sometimes using source material reduced in volume to a whisper. According to Falisi, it lacks a sense of comfort; in contrast with Stage 1s first signs, Stage 5 presents complete disorder. The record uses the most vocals of the series and includes recognisable English lyrics; near the end of the opening track, a man announces, "This selection will be a mandolin solo by Mr. James Fitzgerald." Like Stage 4, Stage 5s track names are clinical, using neurological references such as plaque, entanglements, synapses, and the retrogenesis hypothesis; Hazelwood considered titles such as "Advanced Plaque Entanglements" and "Sudden Time Regression Into Isolation" to be documenting dementia's "inhumanity".

Stage 6, according to Kirby, "is without description." UWIRE's Esther Ju called it the most interpretative record of the series, and said "most would describe it as the sounds of the void." While Stage 5 had snippets of instruments and voices, Stage 6 features drowned, empty compositions consisting of hissing and crackling, which Hazelwood interpreted as portraying the patient's apathy. It generally consists of sound collages in which the music is audible, yet distant. The stage's song titles feature less clinical and more emotional phrases, such as "A Confusion So Thick You Forget Forgetting" and "A Brutal Bliss Beyond This Empty Defeat". It is the most distant from the sounds of An Empty Bliss and portrays strong anxiety. After releasing Stage 6, Kirby commented on the YouTube video of the complete edition: "Thanks for the support through the years. May the ballroom remain eternal. C'est fini."

The final track, "Place in the World Fades Away", features organ drones which have been compared to the 2014 film Interstellar soundtrack. The organ eventually gives way to a needle drop. The climax of Everywhere, six minutes before the project's end, features a clearly audible choir sourced from a degraded vinyl record. The series ends with a minute of silence representing the patient's death. Although the moment evoked varying interpretations from commentators, the most accepted theory by critics and medics is that it represents terminal lucidity, the phenomenon of patients experiencing clarity briefly before death. Falisi considered it the movement of the patient's soul to the afterlife. The last six minutes sample a performance of Bach's aria "Lasst Mich Ihn Nur Noch Einmal Küssen" ("Just Let Me Kiss Him One More Time") of the St Luke Passion, BWV 246. The sample was also used on the track "Friends Past Reunited" from Stairway To The Stars. This was interpreted by one reviewer as the Caretaker alias in a "full circle moment".

Production

Kirby produced Everywhere at the End of Time at his flat in Krakow using a computer "designed specifically for the production of music". He made more tracks for the first stage alone than in the alias' entire history. The albums were produced a year before their release; Stage 3 development began in September 2016 and Stage 6 began in May 2018. Kirby stated that the first three stages have "subtle but crucial differences", presenting the same general style "based on the mood and the awareness that a person with the condition would feel." Kirby wanted the mastering process, done by Andreas "Lupo" Lubich, to be "consistent sounding all the way through". He said a compositional strategy was to use various covers of sampled songs to associate specific emotional messages with each. Rather than buying physical records as he did with An Empty Bliss, Kirby found most samples online, stating, "It's possible to find ten versions of one song now." Kirby noted that Stage 1 looped short sections of songs, while Stage 2 would let the samples fully play. Describing Stage 3 to be the most similar to An Empty Bliss, Kirby stated Stages 1–3 could be listened to on shuffle while remaining cohesive. Between the release of the third and fourth stages, Kirby announced he was "moving house and studio".

Kirby's production focus was on the last three stages; he wanted to create what he called a "listenable chaos". Kirby added that, while producing Stage 4, he realised that the final three stages "had to be made from the viewpoint of post-awareness." Explaining the name, Kirby titled them "Post-Awareness" because they are when the patient is not aware of a disorder. Kirby reported feeling pressured while working on the final three stages, saying, "I'd be finishing one stage, mastering another, all whilst starting another stage." In composing the fourth and fifth stages, Kirby claimed he possessed over 200 hours of music and "compiled it based on mood". The Believers Landon Bates likened Stage 4 to "Radio Music" (1956) by composer John Cage, to which Kirby responded that Cage's style of aleatoric music—music with random elements—inspired the later stages. He said Stage 5 is "a distinct change" from Stage 4, writing that "it's not immediate but it's a crucial symptom." According to Kirby, the production of the final stage was the hardest, due to the public's expectations and "the weight of the previous five [stages] falling all on this now."

Artwork and packaging

The album covers for Everywhere at the End of Time are abstract oil paintings by Kirby's long-time friend Ivan Seal. They are minimalist and become less recognisable with each stage; each presents a single object and has no text. Tiny Mix Tapes included Beaten Frowns After—the artwork for Stage 1—in their lists for best album covers of 2016 and of the 2010s. Some have compared Kirby and Seal: both are English-born and have similar ways of producing art. Seal paints objects based on memory, saying, "Art is always working from memory".

The first three album covers are titled Beaten Frowns After (2016), Pittor Pickgown in Khatheinstersper (2015) and Hag (2014), respectively. Beaten Frowns After features a grey unravelling scroll on a vacant horizon, with newspaper folds similar to a brain's creases, which Teen Ink writer Sydney Leahy likened to the patient's awareness of the disease's progression. Pittor Pickgown in Khatheinstersper portrays four wilting flowers in an abstract rotten rock vase. Hag presents a kelp plant distorted to the extreme, which Sam Goldner of Tiny Mix Tapes described as "a vase spilling out into ripples of disorder."

The paintings for the final three stages are respectively titled Giltsholder (2017), Eptitranxisticemestionscers Desending (2017) and Necrotomigaud (2018). Giltsholder is the first artwork to present a human figure, in the form of a blue-and-green bust with unrecognisable facial features. According to Goldner, the figure appears smiling when viewed from a distance; Leahy interpreted it as representing the patient's lack of capability to recognise a person. Considered the most abstract cover, Eptitranxisticemestionscers Desending depicts an abstract mass, which writers claim is a woman or a marble-like staircase. Hazelwood interpreted it as representing the patient's mind; although it once presented experiences, it is now unrecognisable. Necrotomigaud presents an art board with a square of loosely attached blue tape, reflecting Stage 6 emotional emptiness.

Seal's paintings and the Caretaker's music were featured in the 2019 French art exhibition Everywhere, an Empty Bliss by the company FRAC Auvergne, which featured documents about the duo's work and revealed the names of the album covers. Previously, Seal's paintings were also featured near one of Kirby's performances in the 2019 exhibition Cukuwruums. In 2018, when asked why the digital pages of the album detailed the concept with text but the physical packaging did not include such descriptions, Kirby said that Seal's paintings are important to each stage, and he was happy Kirby used them as the album covers. Writing about the overlap between their artistic visions, Kirby said that both "collide in a great way". He believed his liner notes would distract from Seal's art and kept them in digital form for listeners that "search a little deeper".

Release and promotion
Kirby initially thought of not producing Everywhere at all. Six months before the release of the first stage, he talked about it to other people, explaining he "wanted to be sure it didn't come across as this highbrow, pretentious idea." The albums were released over three years: the first stage in 2016, the next two in 2017, the penultimate two in 2018, and the final one in 2019. According to Kirby, the delays were made to "give a sense of time passing" to the listeners. Although he expressed concern with dementia as a social problem, Kirby has said the disorder does not affect him "at a personal level", calling it "more of a fascination than a fear". He noted that each dementia patient's experience is unique, asserting his portrayal was "only unique to the Caretaker". Kirby stated his music is not available on Spotify due to his criticism of it, and the "constant devaluing of music by big business and streaming services."

When releasing the first stage on 22 September 2016, Kirby announced the series' concept, "diagnosing" the Caretaker alias with dementia through albums that reveal "progression, loss and disintegration" as they fell "towards the abyss of complete memory loss". This statement misled some to believe that Kirby himself had been diagnosed with early-onset dementia, namely The Faders Jordan Darville and Marvin Lin of Tiny Mix Tapes. Both publications updated their posts when Kirby clarified that he did not have dementia; only the Caretaker persona did. He released Stage 3 and We, So Tired of All the Darkness in Our Lives on the same day, the latter under his own name. Releasing Stage 5, Kirby's press release compared the series' progression to the then-ongoing Brexit process. The Caretaker's final record, released alongside Stage 6, was Everywhere, an Empty Bliss (2019), a compilation album of work initially meant to be used on Everywhere.

Anonymous visual artist Weirdcore created music videos for the first two stages, both uploaded to Kirby's YouTube channel vvmtest. Released in September 2016 and 2017, they have effects such as time-stretching and delay. Weirdcore was known for creating visuals for ambient musician Aphex Twin. Kirby said the visuals are important to his music and called them "otherworldly". In 2020, Weirdcore's visuals were presented with Kirby's music in a YouTube video titled "[−0º]"; it was chosen as one of the best audiovisual works of the year by Fact.

In December 2017, Kirby performed at the Krakow Barbican for the Unsound Festival in Poland. The show was his first since 2011, featuring Seal's art and Weirdcore's visuals. The music videos would be presented throughout the Caretaker's following shows. He participated at Unsound's May 2019 "Solidarity" show, also set in Krakow. In April 2020, he was due to perform live for the "[Re]setting" Rewire Festival, which would have occurred at the Hague in the Netherlands; the show was cancelled due to the COVID-19 pandemic. However, Kirby has an interview and a performance on Rewire also at the Hague scheduled for 6–10 April 2023. Kirby performed at Donaufestival Krems on 7 May 2022, and is expected to appear at Primavera Sound Barcelona on 3 June. Previously expressing hesitation to perform, Kirby said he would now make each show "a battle to make sense from the confusion". He added that Weirdcore would bring Seal's paintings "alive", with the visual art also exploring the idea of making the public "feel ill".

Critical reception

Everywhere at the End of Time received increasingly positive reactions as it progressed, with one writer theorising that Kirby's expansion on the themes of An Empty Bliss was due to its concept being "loaded beyond the capacities of a 40-some-minute ambient record". In March 2021, it peaked as the best-selling record on Boomkat, the platform Kirby uses for his physical releases. Initially, in response to "today's culture of instant reaction", Kirby said, "these parts have been looped for a specific reason... which will become clear down the line."

The first three stages of the series were criticised for their portrayal of dementia. Pitchfork contributor Brian Howe expressed concern that the first stage may be a romanticised, if not exploitative, view of a mental illness. He found Kirby's description inaccurate; Howe "watched [his] grandmother succumb to it for a decade before she died, and it was very little like a 'beautiful daydream.' In fact, there was nothing aesthetic about it." Pat Beane of Tiny Mix Tapes considered Stage 1 the most "pleasurable listen from [t]he Caretaker", although Falisi regarded Stage 2 as neither "decay or beauty", "diagnosis or cure". In 2021, Hazelwood described Stage 3 as Kirby's default "bag of tricks", but argued that these "are essential to the journey"; she followed this up by calling the first three stages "easily-digested" and "so fast. Almost too fast." She argued that "without those stages and their comforts, the transition into Stage 4 wouldn't have the crushing impact it does."

The last three stages' portrayal of dementia was generally described as better. Pitchfork contributor Miles Bowe described Stage 4 as avoiding "a risk of pale romanticisation", and Goldner felt that the record had "broken the loop", although he added that "Temporary Bliss State" is not "real dementia". Falisi, writing about Goldner, considered such loop to be "unspooling (endlessly) off the capstans and piling up until new shapes form." He described the album's sound as "the uncanny choke of absence", and argued, "If the thing is gone, why do I still feel it?" Characterisations of Stage 6 ranged from "a mental descent rendered in agonisingly slow motion" to "something extra-ambient whose aches are of the cosmos." Critics often described Stage 6 with additional praise; one called it a "jaw-dropping piece of sonic art" with "a unique force".

Critics have also commented on the interpretative, "thought-provoking" feelings evoked by the series as a whole. Dave Gurney of Tiny Mix Tapes called it "disturbing", while Hazelwood said that its music "sticks with you, its melodies haunting and infecting." Luka Vukos, in his review for the blog HeadStuff, argued that the "empathy machine" of the series "is characterised not by words", and its power "rests in [Kirby's] marrying of [the vinyl record] with the most contemporary modes of digital recall and manipulation." Having written about some of Kirby's earlier music, Simon Reynolds said the Caretaker "could have renamed himself the Caregiver, for on this project he resembles a sonic nurse in a hospice for the terminally ill." In his opinion, "titles are heartbreaking and often describe the music more effectively than the reviewer ever could."

Accolades
Everywhere at the End of Time appeared the most on year-end lists of The Quietus and Tiny Mix Tapes. The latter reviewed each album, except for Stage 3, and gave the first, fourth and sixth stages the "EUREKA!" award, given to albums "explor[ing] the limits of noise and music" and "worthy of careful consideration". Resident Advisor included Stage 6 in its listing of 2019's best albums. Quietus contributor Maria Perevedentseva chose "We Don't Have Many Days" as one of the best songs of 2016; Stage 5 would later be included in the publication's listing of the best music of September 2018. Stage 6 was named the website's "Lead Review" of the week and the best "miscellaneous" music release of 2019.

Impact and popularity
Considered some of the best albums of the 2010s, Everywhere at the End of Time is regarded by several critics and musicians as Kirby's magnum opus. One reviewer singled out the two penultimate stages, the most chaotic ones, as making listeners reflect on the feeling of having dementia. Everywhere conceptualisation also received acclaim: the portrayal of dementia was described by The Vinyl Factory as "remarkably emotive" and by Vogues Corey Seymour as "life-changing". Tiny Mix Tapes writer Jessie Dunn Rovinelli said Stage 6s "corny" ending gives "the release his concept might want to refuse but that our decaying, sappy minds want." Inspired by the Caretaker, the fan-made 100-track album Memories Overlooked was released in 2017 by vaporwave musicians whose elder relatives had dementia. Daily Record writer Darren McGarvey claimed he felt "struck by a deep sense of gratitude" after finishing Everywhere, stating that is the "power of a proper piece of art", and author Cole Quinn called Everywhere the greatest album of all time.

Later in October, users on the social media platform TikTok created a challenge of listening to the entire series in one sitting, due to its long length and existential themes. Kirby knew about the phenomenon from an exponential growth of views on the series' YouTube upload (27 million as of ); only 12% of them came from the platform's algorithm, whereas direct searches made up over 50%. In a video some writers hypothesised as the cause of Everywheres popularity, YouTuber A Bucket of Jake called the series "the darkest album I have ever heard". Following its popularity, the series appeared often on Bandcamp's ambient recommendations.

Some TikTok users shared fictional creepypasta stories of the series with claims that it cures patients or, conversely, that it introduces symptoms of dementia in people. The claims and the listening challenge triggered a negative backlash from others, who felt it offended patients. Kirby, however, did not feel this way, but rather saw the series as giving teenagers "an understanding into the symptoms a person with dementia may face." Lazlo Rugoff of the Vinyl Factory found the TikTok phenomenon drew "an unlikely audience" of teenagers to Kirby's music, and Everywhere was later called by TikTok's William Gruger a niche discovery and "unexpected hit". The series has seen continued use as a meme throughout the early 2020s, coinciding with the period of the COVID-19 pandemic and its mental health issues on teenagers. Several parodies of the albums have been created by new fans following this period, including one sampling the music library from SpongeBob SquarePants.

In 2021, Everywhere gained attention among the modding community of the rhythm game Friday Night Funkin' (2020); the mod Everywhere at the End of Funk was described by Wren Romero of esports group Gamurs as "one of the most unique experiences of any FNF mod." The series was also popularised for its relation to the Backrooms, a creepypasta about an endless empty office space, which writer Silvia Trevisson said stemmed from their similar portrayals of absurd states of mind.

Scientific response
Within neurological research groups, Everywhere at the End of Time has been seen as a generally positive influence. One Iowa State University researcher found the series to present the "chilling reality" of Alzheimer's disease, highlighting the gradual progression of calmness into confusion. Brian Browne, the president of Dementia Care Education, said Kirby's portrayal of Alzheimer's disease is "a much welcome thing" to caretakers of dementia patients. He praised the series' newfound attention, as "it produces the empathy that's needed."

Browne concludes:

Partially positive of Kirby's work, French neuropsychologist Hervé Platel praised Everywheres approach and general faithfulness to the process of dementia. However, Platel also criticised the series for giving the impression of memory as a linear system, explaining that musical memory is the last to fade away.

Track listing
Adapted from Bandcamp. Total lengths and notes adapted from Kirby's YouTube uploads of Stages 1–3, Stages 4–6, and the complete edition.

Personnel
Credits adapted from YouTube.
 Leyland Kirby – producer
 Ivan Seal – artwork
 Andreas Lubich – mastering

Release history
All released worldwide by record label History Always Favours the Winners.

See also

 Alzheimer's disease in the media
 It's Such a Beautiful Day (2012), a film series portraying mental illness and immortality
 List of concept albums
 Music therapy for Alzheimer's disease
 William Utermohlen, an artist with Alzheimer's disease who drew six self-portraits to chronicle the disorder's advancement

Notes

References

External links
 
 
 #EverywhereAtTheEndOfTime on TikTok
 "We are in the Shadow of a Distant Fire" by Leyland Kirby

2016 albums
2017 albums
2018 albums
2019 albums
The Caretaker (musician) albums
Media about Alzheimer's disease
Internet memes introduced in 2020
Concept album series
Dark ambient albums
Electronic albums by English artists
Experimental music albums by English artists
Sound collage albums
Plunderphonics albums